The 1984 Paris–Nice was the 42nd edition of the Paris–Nice cycle race and was held from 7 March to 14 March 1984. The race started in Issy-les-Moulineaux and finished at the Col d'Èze. The race was won by Sean Kelly of the Skil team.

Route

General classification

References

1984
1984 in road cycling
1984 in French sport
March 1984 sports events in Europe
1984 Super Prestige Pernod International